Georg Carl Tänzler (also known as Count Carl von Cosel (February 8, 1877 – July 3, 1952), was a German-born radiology technologist at the Marine-Hospital Service in Key West, Florida. He developed an obsession with a young Cuban-American tuberculosis patient, Elena "Helen" Milagro de Hoyos (July 31, 1909 – October 25, 1931), that carried on well after  her death. In 1933, almost two years after her death, Tanzler removed Hoyos' body from its tomb, and lived with the corpse at his home for seven years until its discovery by Hoyos' relatives and authorities in 1940.

Name

Tanzler went by many names; he was listed as Georg Karl Tänzler on his German marriage certificate. He was listed as Carl Tanzler von Cosel on his United States citizenship papers, and he was listed as Carl Tanzler on his Florida death certificate. Some of his hospital records were signed Count Carl Tanzler von Cosel.

Early life

He was born as Karl Tänzler or Georg Karl Tänzler on February 8, 1877 in Dresden, Germany.

Tanzler grew up in Imperial Germany, but, at some point, wound up in Australia just prior to the outbreak of World War I.  The following "Editorial Note" accompanying the autobiographical account "The Trial Bay Organ: A Product of Wit and Ingenuity" by "Carl von Cosel" in the Rosicrucian Digest of March and April 1939, gives details about his stay in Australia before his internment during the Great War, as well as his subsequent return to Germany after the War:

Tanzler's account of Trial Bay Gaol, his secret building of a sailboat, etc., is confirmed by Nyanatiloka Mahathera, who mentions that he planned to escape from the Gaol with "Count Carl von Cosel" in a sailboat, and provides other information about the internment of Germans in Australia during World War I.

Around 1920, following his return to Germany, Tanzler married Doris Schäfer (1889–1977).  Together they had two children: Ayesha Tanzler (1922–1998), and Clarista Tanzler (1924–1934), who died of diphtheria.

Tanzler emigrated to the United States from Germany in 1926, sailing from Rotterdam on February 6, 1926 to Havana, Cuba. From Cuba he settled in Zephyrhills, Florida, where his sister had already emigrated, and was later joined by his wife and two daughters. Leaving his family behind in Zephyrhills in 1927, he took a job as a radiology technician at the U.S. Marine Hospital in Key West, Florida under the name Carl von Cosel.

During his childhood in Germany, and later while traveling briefly in Genoa, Italy, Tanzler claimed to have been visited by visions of a dead, purported ancestor, Countess Anna Constantia von Cosel, who revealed the face of his true love, an exotic dark-haired woman, to him.

Maria Elena Milagro de Hoyos

On April 22, 1930, while working at the Marine Hospital in Key West, Tanzler met Maria Elena "Helen" Milagro de Hoyos (1909–1931), a local Cuban-American woman who had been brought to the hospital by her mother for an examination. Tanzler immediately recognized her as the beautiful dark-haired woman that had been revealed to him in his earlier "visions." By all accounts, Hoyos was viewed as a local beauty in Key West.

Elena was the daughter of local cigar maker Francisco "Pancho" Hoyos (1883–1934) and Aurora Milagro (1881–1940). She had two sisters, Florinda "Nana" Milagro Hoyos (1906–1944), who married Mario Medina (–1944) and also succumbed to tuberculosis; and Celia Milagro Hoyos (1913–1934). Medina, Nana's husband, was electrocuted trying to rescue a coworker who hit a powerline with his crane at a construction site.

On February 18, 1926, Elena married Luis Mesa (1908–1974), the son of Caridad and Isaac Mesa. Mesa left Elena shortly after she suffered a miscarriage of the couple's child, and moved to Miami. Elena was legally married to Mesa at the time of her death.

Elena was eventually diagnosed with tuberculosis, a typically fatal disease at the time, that eventually claimed the lives of almost all of her immediate family. Tanzler, with his self-professed medical knowledge, attempted to treat and cure Elena with a variety of medicines, as well as X-ray and electrical equipment, that were brought to the Hoyos' home. Tanzler showered Elena with gifts of jewelry and clothing, and allegedly professed his love to her, but no evidence has surfaced to show that any of his affection was reciprocated by Elena.

Obsession

Despite Tanzler's best efforts, Elena died of tuberculosis at her parents' home in Key West on October 25, 1931. Tanzler paid for her funeral, and with the permission of her family, he then commissioned the construction of an above ground mausoleum in the Key West Cemetery, which he visited almost every night.

One evening in April 1933, Tanzler crept through the cemetery where Elena was buried and removed her body from the mausoleum, carting it through the cemetery after dark on a toy wagon, and transported it to his home. He reportedly said that Elena’s spirit would come to him when he would sit by her grave and serenade her corpse with a favorite Spanish song. He also said that she would often tell him to take her from the grave.

Tanzler attached the corpse's bones together with piano wire and fitted the face with glass eyes. As the skin of the corpse decomposed, Tanzler replaced it with silk cloth soaked in wax and plaster of paris. As the hair fell out of Elena's decomposing scalp, Tanzler fashioned a wig from her hair, which he had previously obtained from her mother. Tanzler filled the corpse's abdominal and chest cavity with rags to keep the original form, dressed Elena's remains in stockings, jewelry, and gloves, and kept the body in his bed. Tanzler also used copious amounts of perfume, disinfectants, and preserving agents to mask the odor and forestall the effects of the corpse's decomposition.

In October 1940, Elena's sister Florinda heard rumors of Tanzler sleeping with the disinterred body of her sister and confronted Tanzler at his home, where Elena's body was eventually discovered (he was also caught dancing with her corpse in front of an open window). Florinda notified the authorities, and Tanzler was arrested and detained. Tanzler was psychiatrically examined and found mentally competent to stand trial on the charge of "wantonly and maliciously destroying a grave and removing a body without authorization." After a preliminary hearing on October 9, 1940 at the Monroe County Courthouse in Key West, Tanzler was held to answer on the charge, but the case was eventually dropped, and he was released, as the statute of limitations for the crime had expired.

Shortly after the corpse's discovery by authorities, Elena's body was examined by physicians and pathologists, and put on public display at the Dean-Lopez Funeral Home, where it was viewed by as many as 6,800 people. Elena's body was eventually returned to the Key West Cemetery where the remains were buried in an unmarked grave, in a secret location, to prevent further tampering.

The facts underlying the case and the preliminary hearing drew much interest from the media at the time (most notably, from the Key West Citizen and Miami Herald), and created a sensation among the public, both regionally and nationwide. The public mood was generally sympathetic to Tanzler, whom many viewed as an eccentric "romantic".

Though not reported contemporaneously, research (most notably by authors Harrison and Swicegood) has revealed evidence of Tanzler's necrophilia with Elena's corpse.  Two physicians (Dr. DePoo and Dr. Foraker) who attended the 1940 autopsy of Elena's remains recalled in 1972 that a vaginal tube had been inserted in the vaginal area of the corpse that allowed for intercourse.  Others contend that since no evidence of necrophilia was presented at the 1940 preliminary hearing, and because the physicians' "proof" surfaced in 1972, over 30 years after the case had been dismissed, the necrophilia allegation is questionable. While no existing contemporary photographs of the autopsy or photographs taken at the public display show a tube, the necrophilia claim was repeated by the HBO Autopsy program in 1999.

Later life and death

In 1944, Tanzler moved to Pasco County, Florida, close to Zephyrhills, where he wrote an autobiography that appeared in the pulp publication, Fantastic Adventures, in 1947. His home was near his wife Doris, who apparently helped to support Tanzler in his later years. Tanzler received United States citizenship in 1950 in Tampa.

Separated from his obsession, Tanzler used a death mask to create a life-sized effigy of Elena, and lived with it until his death at age 75 on July 3, 1952. His body was discovered on the floor of his home three weeks after his death. He died under the name "Carl Tanzler".

It has been recounted that Tanzler was found in the arms of Elena's effigy upon discovery of his corpse, but his obituary reported that he died on the floor behind one of his organs. The obituary recounted: "a metal cylinder on a shelf above a table in it wrapped in silken cloth and a robe was a waxen image".

It has been written (most notably by Swicegood) that Tanzler had the bodies switched (or that Elena's remains were secretly returned to him), and that he died with the real body of Elena.

The story of Tanzler and Elena would be reproduced in pulp magazines in the years following his death, with various parties adding new details to the case. An article written by Michelfelder in 1982 tells of how renovation workers found a note allegedly written by Tanzler, confessing to have killed Elena by poisoning her:She died because I gave this to her mercifully. I mixed the root of wolfsbane (monkshood) with aconite diluted. It was palatable and my loved one departed this miserable world on October 25, 1931. Suffer no more sweet Elena. I have sent you to the angels with my golden elixir... Perez also claimed Tanzler had once told him that he 'would kill Elena if necessary to fulfil [his] destiny' The poison confession letter article was also cited by historian David L. Sloan on episode 44 of the NightMerica podcast.

In popular culture

Exhibits

 Portions of the original memorial plaque that was commissioned by Tanzler and affixed to Elena Hoyos's mausoleum have been reassembled and are on display at the Martello Gallery-Key West Art and Historical Museum in Key West.
 True Crime Kent Podcast Episode Karl Tanzler

Publications

 Fantastic Adventures Tanzler von Cosel, Karl (September 1947); "The Secret of Elena's Tomb"
 “A Haunted History of Pasco County (Haunted America)” by Madonna Jervis Wise; Arcadia Publishing

Music

 In 2003, two bands released their musical interpretations of the Tanzler story, And You Will Know Us By the Trail of Dead's  The Secret of Elena's Tomb album, and Sleep Station's Von Cosel album.
 In 2007, the band The Black Dahlia Murder released a song titled “Deathmask Divine”, on their Nocturnal album which tells the story.
 In 2008, the Swedish band ChansoNoir released the EP Count Von Cosels Obsession, with the B-side A Cemetery Serenade presenting an instrumental piece reenacting Carl Tanzler's organ playing in the tomb.
 In 2009, Mike Glendinning released two songs inspired by Tanzler's story, "Elena" and "Dust Off My Bride," on his "Psychotic America: Lullabies & Necrophilia" album.
 The 2010 song "Wax and Wire" by Portland-based band Loch Lomond is inspired by the story of Tanzler and Elena.
 In 2013, Sharon Needles released  the single "Dead Girls Never Say No" inspired by Tanzler on her album PG-13.

Television

 In 1999, the program Autopsy 6: Secrets of the Dead profiled the Tanzler case, in a segment titled "The Strange Obsession of Dr. Carl von Cosel."
 In 2000, the History Channel program Haunted History: Key West detailed the "Elena Hoyos / Carl Tanzler" case.
 In 2010, an episode of the science-fiction TV drama series Fringe entitled "Marionette" aired, which appeared to be loosely based on the Tanzler story.
 On October 24, 2013, the case of Carl Tanzler was featured on Mysteries at the Museum season 4, episode 10.
 In 2014, the NBC series The Blacklist featured a plotline in the twentieth episode of its second season that resembled the Tanzler incident. A smuggler is revealed to have been pilfering corpses from graveyards and using them in a "corpse mail order bride" business as part of an alleged Chinese tradition involving unmarried decedents. Remains found in the smuggler's facility closely resemble the corpse of Hoyos after its retrieval from Tanzler's residence.
 In 2015, the story of Tanzler and Elena Hoyos was featured in an Investigation Discovery series True Nightmares episode entitled "Overstay Your Welcome."
 In 2020, Tanzler's story was featured on an episode entitled "Cryptic Messages" of the Travel Channel show True Terror with Robert Englund.

Theater

 In 2019, the musical It Happened in Key West debuted in London's West End theater district   The original cast recording can be heard here, on YouTube:

Podcasts 

 In 2020, the podcast Ain't it Scary? with Sean & Carrie covered the story on their episode "Count von Cosel & His Mummy Bride".
 In February 2023, the Mr Ballen Podcast covered the story in episode 107, “The Obsession".

See also

Incidents of necrophilia
Cadaver Synod

References

1877 births
1952 deaths
Body snatchers
Counts of Germany
German emigrants to the United States
German nobility
History of Key West, Florida
Marine Hospital Service personnel
Necrophiles
People from Zephyrhills, Florida
People from Dresden
People from the Kingdom of Saxony